The 2012 Tour of Austria was the 64th edition of the Tour of Austria, an annual bicycle race. Departing from Innsbruck on July 1, it concluded in Vienna on July 8. The 1153.9 km-long stage race was part of the 2012 UCI Europe Tour, and was rated as a 2.HC event. The winner was the Dane Jakob Fuglsang of the  squad.

Teams
18 teams were invited to participate in the tour: 6 UCI ProTeams, 8 UCI Professional Continental Teams and 4 UCI Continental Teams.

Stages

Stage 1
1 July 2012 – Innsbruck to Innsbruck,

Stage 2
2 July 2012 – Innsbruck to Kitzbüheler Horn,

Stage 3
3 July 2012 – Kitzbühel to Lienz,

Stage 4
4 July 2012 – Lienz to Sankt Johann im Pongau/Alpendorf,

Stage 5
5 July 2012 – Sankt Johann im Pongau/Alpendorf to Sonntagberg,

Stage 6
6 July 2012 – Waidhofen an der Ybbs to Melk,

Stage 7
7 July 2012 – Podersdorf am See to Podersdorf am See,

Stage 8
8 July 2012 – Podersdorf am See to Vienna,

Classification leadership

Final standings

General classification

Points classification

Mountains classification

Young rider classification

Team classification

References
General
;Specific

External links

Tour of Austria
2012 in Austrian sport
Tour of Austria